This is a list of female Muslim heads of state and heads of government. Some countries do not have a Muslim-majority. The list is chronological.

List

See also
List of the first women heads of state and government in Muslim-majority countries
List of elected and appointed female heads of state and government
Muslim women political leaders
Council of Women World Leaders
Women in government

References

Muslim-majority
Muslim-majority
First female heads of governments, Muslim-majority
First female government heads
First female government heads
Female government heads
First female heads of government, Muslim-majority
Lists of women